Ramón de Quintana Dalmau (born 6 February 1972) is a Spanish retired footballer who played as a central defender.

Club career
Born in Girona, Catalonia, de Quintana started his senior career with UE Figueres in his native region, playing in two Segunda División seasons. In his second year, he suffered the first of a national record eight relegations; in the 1993–94 campaign he made his La Liga debut with CA Osasuna, but appeared rarely as the Navarrese also dropped down a division.

Subsequently, de Quintana moved to Madrid's Rayo Vallecano in the second level, earning promotion in his first season but being relegated in his third. With his following club, CP Mérida, he would suffer two relegations in three years, although the last one was due to financial irregularities as the Extremadura team had finished in sixth position in division two.

De Quintana returned to Rayo in summer 2000, helping the side reach the quarter-finals of the UEFA Cup in his debut season – after they had been granted a spot in the European competition via the Fair Play ranking – but was again relegated in 2002–03, after which he left at the age of 31.

De Quintana's last club was Cádiz CF, where he played for five years, winning the second tier in 2005 but being immediately relegated back. After only appearing in nine league games in the 2007–08 campaign, with the Andalusians dropping to Segunda División B, he retired from football at the age of 36, amassing totals of 458 matches and 14 goals in 17 professional seasons (204/6 in the top flight alone).

International career
De Quintana represented Spain at the 1991 FIFA World Youth Championship in Portugal, playing all the matches and minutes in an eventual quarter-final exit.

References

External links

Stats and bio at Cadistas1910 

1972 births
Living people
Sportspeople from Girona
Spanish footballers
Footballers from Catalonia
Association football defenders
La Liga players
Segunda División players
CF Damm players
UE Figueres footballers
CA Osasuna players
Rayo Vallecano players
CP Mérida footballers
Cádiz CF players
Spain youth international footballers
Spain under-21 international footballers
Catalonia international footballers